Hieracium senescens is a species of flowering plant belonging to the family Asteraceae.

Synonym:
 Hieracium senescens subsp. senescens

References

senescens